The Campus of Clemson University was originally the site of U.S. Vice President John C. Calhoun's plantation, named Fort Hill.  The plantation passed to his daughter, Anna, and son-in-law, Thomas Green Clemson.  On Clemson's death in 1888, he willed the land to the state of South Carolina for the creation of a public university.

The university was founded in 1889, and three buildings from the initial construction still exist today: Hardin Hall (built in 1890), Main Building (later renamed Tillman Hall) (1894), and Godfrey Hall (1898).  Other periods of large expansion occurred in 1936–1938, when 8 new buildings constructed, and the late 1950s through 1970, when no fewer than 25 buildings were constructed, most in a similar architectural style.

The campus contains two historic districts listed on the National Register of Historic Places: the Clemson University Historic District I on the northern edge of campus, and the Clemson University Historic District II in the center of campus.

Academic buildings

Administrative buildings

Residential buildings

Bryan Mall, "The Horseshoe"

The Shoeboxes

Fraternity/Sorority Quad

On-campus apartments

Others

Dining halls & Unions

Athletic & recreation buildings

Other facilities

Notes

References

External links
 Clemson Campus Album
 Campus Map

 
Clemson
Clemson University